Wolf Haas (born 14 December  1960) is an Austrian writer. He is most widely known for his crime fiction novels featuring detective Simon Brenner, four of which were made into films. He has won several prizes for his works, including the German prize for crime fiction (Deutscher Krimipreis).

Life 
Wolf Haas was born in 1960 in Maria Alm am Steinernen Meer, which is part of the Austrian province of Salzburg. After university he worked as an advertising copywriter. Between 1996 and 2003 he wrote seven detective stories, of which six featured detective Simon Brenner. Four were made into films: Komm, süßer Tod (Come Sweet Death), Silentium, Der Knochenmann (The Boneman) and Das ewige Leben (Life Eternal). He has won several prizes for his works, including placed in the German prize for crime fiction (Deutscher Krimi Preis) three times (1997, 1999, 2000), including one first place, and the Literaturpreis der Stadt Bremen 2013.

Works

Thriller
 Brenner detective stories (and where they are set):
 Auferstehung der Toten (Zell am See), Rowohlt, Reinbek 1996,  (Translated by Annie Janusch as Resurrection, Melville House, 2014)
 Der Knochenmann (Klöch in Styria), Rowohlt, Reinbek 1997,  (Translated by Annie Janusch as The Bone Man, Melville House, 2013)
 Komm, süßer Tod (Vienna), Rowohlt, Reinbek 1998,  (Translated by Annie Janusch as Come, Sweet Death!, Melville House, 2014)
 Silentium! (Salzburg), Rowohlt, Reinbek 1999, 
 Wie die Tiere (Vienna), Rowohlt, Reinbek 2001, 
 Das ewige Leben (Graz), Hoffmann und Campe, Hamburg 2003, 
 Der Brenner und der liebe Gott, Hoffmann und Campe, Hamburg 2009,  (Translated by Annie Janusch as Brenner and God, Melville House, 2012)
 Brennerova, Hoffmann und Campe, Hamburg 2014, 
 Müll, Hoffmann und Campe, Hamburg 2022, 
 Ausgebremst – Der Roman zur Formel 1, Rowohlt, Reinbek 1998, 
 Das Wetter vor 15 Jahren, 2006, Hoffmann und Campe, Hamburg 2006, translated by Stephanie Gilardi and Thomas S. Hansen as The Weather Fifteen Years Ago, Ariadne Press, Riverside California 2009, 
 Verteidigung der Missionarsstellung. Hoffmann und Campe, Hamburg 2012, 
  Junger Mann. Hoffmann und Campe, Hamburg 2018,

Non-Fiction 
 Sprachtheoretische Grundlagen der Konkreten Poesie. Akademischer Verlag Heinz, Stuttgart 1990 
 Die Liebe in den Zeiten des Cola-Rauschs, Verlag Tauschzentrale, Wien 1993,

Children's Books 
 Die Gans im Gegenteil. Hoffmann und Campe, Hamburg 2010

See also 
 List of Austrian writers
 List of Austrians

References

Further reading 
 Helga Schreckenberger, "Wolf Haas's Brenner Novels – Austrian Adaptations and Transformations of the American Detective Story", in Internet-Zeitschrift für Kulturwissenschaften, Number 17, Februar 2010.

External links 
 Interview with Wolf Haas in the newspaper Welt am Sonntag, 2 January 2011 

1960 births
Living people
20th-century Austrian novelists
21st-century Austrian novelists
Austrian male novelists
Austrian crime fiction writers
Crime fiction writers
People from Zell am See District
20th-century Austrian male writers
21st-century male writers